Above is the eighth studio album from the Swiss heavy metal band Samael, released on 6 March 2009 by Nuclear Blast.

Background
Earlier in 2009 the band began promoting a virtual death metal band from their Myspace profile. The band was called "Above" and featured computer-designed band members in a virtual world, whose lyrics and songs were written by Samael. Later through Myspace, the band announced that they would be taking their side-project Above and turning it into their newest Samael album.

Commenting on the album, Vorph said:

"After 20 years, we've tried to do an album that would represent what SAMAEL is all about and we did 'Solar Soul'. We feel now it is the right time to [remind] the people where we come from and that's exactly what 'Above' will do. It is like an enhanced version of our three or four first albums, maybe the missing link between 'Ceremony of Opposites' and 'Passage'. With the 'Era One' project we've tried to work on different influences; with 'Above' we stripped everything down."

Track listing

Notes
The track "Dark Side" is a reworked version of "The Black Face" from the album Worship Him.

Personnel

Samael
 Vorphalack – guitar, vocals
 Makro – guitar
 Masmiseîm – bass
 Xytraguptor – drums, keyboard, programming, production

Technical personnel
 Kris Fredriksson – recording, engineering
 Fredrik Nordström – mixing
 Erik Broheden – mastering
 Patrick Pidoux – artwork, layout, design

Chart positions

References

2009 albums
Samael (band) albums
Nuclear Blast albums